La Jolla Playhouse is a not-for-profit, professional theatre on the campus of the University of California, San Diego.

History
La Jolla Playhouse was founded in 1947 by Gregory Peck, Dorothy McGuire, and Mel Ferrer. In 1983, it was revived under the leadership of Des McAnuff. Since then, the Playhouse's repertoire has included 108 world premieres, thirty-two West Coast premieres, and eight American premieres, and has won more than three hundred honors, including the 1993 Tony Award as America's Outstanding Regional Theatre. It is supported, in part, by grants from the National Endowment for the Arts, the California Arts Council, the City of San Diego, and the County of San Diego. It was announced on April 10, 2007, that Christopher Ashley would succeed McAnuff as artistic director.

Among the 33 productions that originated at the Playhouse before finding success on Broadway are The Who's Tommy, Matthew Broderick's revival of How to Succeed in Business Without Really Trying, Jane Eyre, Dracula, the Musical, Thoroughly Modern Millie, Cry Baby, Bonnie and Clyde, the Pulitzer Prize-winning I Am My Own Wife, 700 Sundays, Jersey Boys, Memphis, Peter and the Starcatcher, Chaplin, Hands on a Hardbody,  Come From Away , for which director Christopher Ashley won the 2017 Tony Award, and Des McAnuff's revival of Jesus Christ Superstar, Zhivago , Big River and SUMMER: The Donna Summer Musical .

Programs 
La Jolla Playhouse provides a number of Learning & Engagement opportunities for children, teens, and adults interested in theatre arts, both as performers and behind-the-scenes. In addition, the Performance Outreach Program (POP Tour) annually brings a professional, world-premiere production to schools, libraries, and community centers throughout San Diego. There are additional summer theater opportunities through the La Jolla Playhouse Conservatory, student matinees, teen council, and many other in-school workshops and classes.

Page to Stage 
La Jolla Playhouse began the Page to Stage Play Development Program in 2001 to facilitate the development of new plays and musicals, offering audiences the rare opportunity to experience the "birth" of a play and take part in its evolution. As a Page to Stage workshop, a production will feature minimal sets and costumes, and will be revised throughout its entire process, including performances. After the performance, audience feedback sessions will provide insight and suggestion for both the creative team and the actors. In the 22 years since the program began, two Page to Stage Productions have gone on to win Tony Awards. Doug Wright's I Am My Own Wife won the 2004 Pulitzer Prize for Drama and Tony Awards for Best Play and Best Leading Actor in a Play (Jefferson Mays); and Billy Crystal's 700 Sundays, a 2004 Page to Stage Production, won the 2005 Tony Award for Special Theatrical Event.

Management

Managing directors
1981–1991: Alan Levey
1992–2004: Terry Dwyer 
2005–2008: Steven Libman  
2009–2018: Michael S. Rosenberg
2018–current: Debby Buchholz

Artists

Artistic directors
1947–1959: Gregory Peck, Dorothy McGuire, Mel Ferrer (founders)
1983–1994: Des McAnuff
1995–1999: Michael Greif
1999–2000: Anne Hamburger
2000–2007: Des McAnuff
2007–   : Christopher Ashley

Notable actors

 Amy Aquino
 Tallulah Bankhead
 Heidi Blickenstaff
 Stephen Bogardus
 Christian Borle
 Matthew Broderick
 Danny Burstein
 Phoebe Cates
 Kim Cattrall
 James Coburn
 Billy Crystal
 Ariana DeBose
 Dann Florek
 Sutton Foster
 John Goodman
 David Marshall Grant
 Neil Patrick Harris
 James Maslow
 Linda Hunt
 Holly Hunter
 Laura Innes
 Bill Irwin
 Laura Linney
 Jon Lovitz
 Groucho Marx
 James Mason
 Jefferson Mays
 Marin Mazzie
 Cynthia Nixon
 Peter Paige
 Jim Parsons
 Amanda Plummer
 Alice Ripley
 Wynn Harmon
 Campbell Scott
 Helen Shaver
 Gary Sinise
 Nancy Travis
 Vivian Vance
 Daphne Rubin-Vega
 Sherie Rene Scott
 Malcolm-Jamal Warner
 Ron Richardson
BD Wong
Hunter Foster

Productions

References

External links

 La Jolla Playhouse official website
 
 California Arts Council
 Christopher Ashley, La Jolla Playhouse Artistic Director – Downstage Center interview at American Theatre Wing, October 2007

Theatre companies in San Diego
La Jolla, San Diego
Regional theatre in the United States
University of California, San Diego
League of Resident Theatres
Tony Award winners
1947 establishments in California
Culture of San Diego
Tourist attractions in San Diego County, California